Thomas Muster was the defending champion and won in the final 7–6(7–4), 6–4 against Andrea Gaudenzi.

Seeds

  Thomas Muster (champion)
  Yevgeny Kafelnikov (first round)
  Albert Costa (first round)
  Gilbert Schaller (first round)
  Paul Haarhuis (semifinals)
  Carlos Costa (quarterfinals)
  Alberto Berasategui (second round)
  Bohdan Ulihrach (first round)

Draw

Finals

Top half

Bottom half

External links
 Main draw

Singles